Hardbass or hard bass is a subgenre of pumping house that originated in Saint Petersburg, Russia during the late 1990s, drawing inspiration from bouncy techno, hardstyle, as well as local Russian influences. Hardbass is characterized by its fast tempo (usually 150–175 BPM), donks, distinctive basslines (commonly known as "hard bounce"), distorted sounds, heavy kicks and occasional chants or rapping. In several European countries, so-called "hardbass scenes" have sprung up, which are events related to the genre that involve multiple people dancing in public while masked, sometimes with moshing involved.

History

Late 1990s–mid 2000s: Saint Petersburg, metal shade, drug raves 
Hardbass first began to emerge in the late 1990s, mainly in the Saint Petersburg electronic dance music underground, when the pumping house genre, built around the bamboo bass, or donk bass (a type of metallic bass synthesizer sound, first invented by Klubbheads in 1997), became a staple in local raves. Eventually, party nights dedicated solely to pumping house were held in Saint Petersburg and to a lesser extent, in Moscow. The most famous venues for pumping raves in Saint Petersburg included those held in the "Rassvet" (Dawn) club and forest raves in a quarry near , an artificial lake not far from Saint Petersburg. Among the DJs kickstarting the domestic pumping house production in Russia were DJ Tolstyak, DJ 8088, DJ Yurbanoid, DJ Solovey, Dj Glyuk, and many others.

This raving scene was markedly different from its later offshoots. It formed a distinct subculture, mostly catering to the lower and middle class youth of Saint Petersburg. Drug use (especially barbiturate, xyrem and amphetamine use) became prevalent in the scene.

To increase the energy of the parties, Saint Petersburg producers and DJs started to increase the BPM of the pumping house they played and produced, eventually reaching 150 BPM and beyond. Saint Petersburg producers would include distinct whistles and other samples into their production, which would later crystallize into the hardbass sound as it is generally known. At the same time the characteristic lingo of hardbass formed, including:
terms for hardbass music itself, like; kolbasa meaning sausage, a derivative of kolbasitsya, a jargon verb meaning hard partying; pump, or pamp, short forpumping house; nasos, the literal translation of the word pump into Russian;
terms for adherents of the culture, like byk (bull), rave gopnik, kolbaser or kolbasyor, meaning one who parties really hard
 terms relating to drug use, like spidy (derivative of speed) for amphetamines, butirat for xyrem, soli (salts) for illegal drugs in general
The scene was known for its dark atmosphere, which, combined with rife drug use, resulted in popular dark satirical party chants, like I have stolen and sold everything from my flat, but in the end I was thus able to go to kolbasa.

The scene formed darker offshoots, most prominently the metal shade subgenre, pioneered by DJ Barabass, DJ Rentgen among others, known for dark and menacing atmosphere, robotic or low pitched monstrous voices and donk bass, mutated into sounds akin to metallic rods hitting one another.

This scene wasn't much concerned with nationalism. According to members of the Moscow Hardbass School, a wave of nationalistic chants started, however, when local hardbass producer DJ Zheleznye Sharniry began to add skinhead chants, like "1 4 8 8", into his productions, "purely for fun", an influence from the widespread Russian skinhead culture of the 2000s.

Late 2000s–early 2010s: sober hardbass, hardbass attacks and spread to Europe
In 2006, a satirical movie titled Pumping Terminator Vol. 1 appeared on YouTube, featuring an older man dancing in a manner typical of gopniks and chanting chastushkas about the clubbing lifestyle in club-goers' lingo during breaks. The soundtrack of this movie included three pumping house tracks produced by XS Project.

In 2010, XS Project, a group of four music producers from Saint Petersburg, released yet another satirical movie on YouTube, together with radio presenters of Gop FM station, accompanying their Bochka, Bass, Kolbasyor (Kick drum, bass and kolbasyor) track, which was released in 2003. In the movie, several artists, DJs and radio presenters, disguised as gopniks, danced in gopnik style on a Saint Petersburg children's playground. The movie was intended to mock the so-called subculture of rave gopniks – young people in tracksuits who would go to rave parties in Russia not to have good time, but to get trashed and cause trouble. The mockery was in the lyrics, which called for a sober and healthy lifestyle, contrary to the way rave gopniks lived. However, street youth in Eastern Europe liked the video and preferred to eschew the irony, and, given the rise of sober right-wing lifestyle in Russia around that time, the dance moves showcased in the movie became basis of a long-lasting series of flash mobs akin to the Harlem Shake meme of the time, when young people in various cities of Eastern Europe would begin to dance, all of a sudden, in gopnik style in the middle of public spaces. However, according to hardbass fans interviewed on one occasion in 2011 in Russia, these flash mobs were a direct answer to spontaneous lezginka street dancing flash mobs, frequent around that time in Russia and popular among young Russian Caucasian males in industrial cities. Hardbass, as they opined, was a Slavic alternative to lezginka. The public places where hardbass flash mobs (or hardbass ataki, meaning hardbass attacks, according to participants) were held included university lecture halls, malls, public transport, and more. Frequent attributes of these flash mobs included Adidas tracksuits, balaclavas and smoke flares. The dance moves for hardbass dancing mostly included disorganized feet stomping, jumping and specific hand gestures, with hands clenched in fists with thumb and pinky fingers protruding. This gesture became known as hardbass koza (hardbass goat, meaning hardbass sign of the horns) in Russian. At first, the flash mob spread mainly only in Belarus, Russia and Ukraine, but eventually dancers from other Eastern European nations, such as Lithuania, Czech Republic, Poland, Slovakia and Serbia  joined in.

Some commentators in Slavic countries of the European Union at first considered these flash mobs to be serious manifestation of right-wing propaganda, especially given the lyrics in the song, saying "We bring hardbass to your home, 1 4 8 8", with "1 4 8 8" being a neo-Nazi lingo for "Fourteen words" and Hitler salute. However, experts quickly grasped that the usage was ironic, and that the hardbass crowds consisted mostly of football hooligans and bored teenagers, rather than of actual neo-Nazis. Neo-Nazis around that times also dismissed the connection to hardbass, blaming it on left-wing and anarchist circles instead. However, commentators still identified some right-wing sympatizers in the hardbass attacks, but, according to Miroslav Mares, an expert in far-right extremism from Brno Masaryk University, the influence of hardbass attacks on public opinion was negligible.

The next wave of hardbass exposure to the world began when the Narkotik KAL (Drug is BAD) music video became viral on YouTube in 2011. The context for this video was a protest, albeit satirical, against illegal substance use and abuse in Russia, and especially against so called "krokodil", which became more widespread after perestroika.

Mid 2010s–late 2010s: memes and limited mainstream in Russia
From the mid-2010s, hardbass frequently features as an Internet meme, accompanying gopniks, squatting, alcoholic habits and poverty as the central stereotypes of the Russian and Slavic lifestyle.

Notes

References 

2000s in music
2010s in music
Electronic dance music genres
Internet culture
Internet memes
Russian styles of music